Melanodrymia is a genus of sea snails, marine gastropod mollusks in the family Melanodrymiidae.

Species
Species within the genus Melanodrymia include:
 Melanodrymia aurantiaca Hickman, 1984
 Melanodrymia brightae Warén & Bouchet, 1993
 Melanodrymia galeronae Warén & Bouchet, 2001

References

 Warén A. & Bouchet P. (1993) New records, species, genera, and a new family of gastropods from hydrothermal vents and hydrocarbon seeps. Zoologica Scripta 22: 1-90

Melanodrymiidae